Ivan Mikhailovich Viskovatiy (Viskovatov) (Иван Михайлович Висковатый (Висковатов) in Russian) (died 25 July 1570 in Moscow) was a Russian diplomat and head of the Posolsky Prikaz (foreign ministry).

Viskovatiy rose to the rank of dyak in 1549 during the time of Ivan the Terrible's intensive organizational activities. Together with Alexei Adashev, he managed Russia's foreign relations until his death. Historians believe that the Posolsky Prikaz was finally formed in 1556 owing to the efforts of Viskovatiy. He was also the one to inventory the archives of the ministry of foreign affairs. In 1561, Viskovatiy was appointed the keeper of the seal, combining, thus, the custody of the seal of the Russian state with the diplomatic department. This tradition would be in place until the 17th century. As keeper of the seal, Viskovatiy was also made a member of the Boyar Duma.

When Ivan the Terrible became seriously ill in 1553, Viskovatiy was the first one to propose to the tsar to choose a successor. He was also among the first to support the nomination of the young Dmitry Ivanovich. In 1554, Viskovatiy was appointed a member of the boyar investigation committee regarding Prince Semeon Rostovsky's treason. That same year, Viskovatiy had to appear before the ecumenical council of the Russian Orthodox Church because he had been influenced by Matvei Bashkin's heresy and had drawn other people into accepting it. The council treated him with leniency and inflicted a three-year penance upon him. In 1563, Viskovatiy went on a diplomatic mission to Denmark to hold negotiations on Livonian affairs; that was the time when tensions between Denmark and Sweden were building up towards the Northern Seven Years' War, in which Russia did not take part, but was a very interested observer. In 1566, Viskovatiy took part in the Zemsky Sobor.

Viskovatiy managed to escape the tsar's disgrace during the 1560s. He had to pay dearly, however, for his alleged involvement in a still unclear affair in 1570. Viskovatiy was accused of his alleged intentions to give Novgorod to the Polish king and Astrakhan and Kazan to the Turkish sultan. He was publicly executed on 25 July 1570 in Moscow.

1570 deaths
Tsardom of Russia people
Year of birth unknown
Diplomats of the Russian Empire